Tom Stone may refer to:

 Tom Stone (soccer), head coach of the women's soccer team at Texas Tech University
 Tom Stone (photographer) (born 1971), American documentary photographer
 Tom Stone (magician) (born 1967), otherwise known as Thomas Bengtsson, Swedish magician, editor and author
 Tom Stone (TV series), a 2002–2003 Canadian TV series, known in the U.S. as Stone Undercover
 Thomas Treadwell Stone (1801–1895), American Unitarian pastor, Abolitionist, and Transcendentalist
 Tom Stone (wrestler), American wrestler

See also
 Thomas Stone (1743–1787), one of the signers of the U.S. Declaration of Independence
 Thomas E. Stone (1869–1959), American civil servant

Stone, Tom